Tolon Naa Alhaji Yakubu Alhassan Tali (1916-1986) was a Ghanaian politician, Paramount Chief of  the Tolon Traditional Area and founding member of the Northern People's Party.

From 1965 to 1968 he was Ghana's High Commissioner to Lagos (Nigeria). He was Ghana's Ambassador to Belgrade (Yugoslavia) during the Second Republic.

In 1972, he was appointed Ghana's High Commissioner to Sierra Leone, and was also accredited to Guinea as an Ambassador.

References

1916 births
1986 deaths
Ghanaian royalty
Dagomba people
High Commissioners of Ghana to Nigeria
Northern People's Party politicians
Ghanaian MPs 1951–1954
Ghanaian MPs 1954–1956
Ghanaian MPs 1956–1965